There were 1 female and 2 male athletes representing the country at the 2000 Summer Paralympics.

Medallists

See also
Zimbabwe at the 2000 Summer Olympics
Zimbabwe at the Paralympics

References

Bibliography

External links
International Paralympic Committee

Nations at the 2000 Summer Paralympics
Paralympics
2000